The women's 20 kilometres walk at the 2013 World Championships in Athletics was held at the Luzhniki Stadium and Moscow streets on 13 August.

The original 27th place walker, Ayman Kozhakhmetova of Kazakhstan, was disqualified for a positive drug test for exogenous testosterone and EPO.

Records
Prior to the competition, the records were as follows:

Qualification standards

Schedule

Results

Final
The race was started at 07.35.

References

External links
20 kilometres walk results at IAAF website

20 kilometres walk
Racewalking at the World Athletics Championships
2013 in women's athletics